The 1999 Challenge Bell was a tennis tournament played on indoor carpet courts at the Club Avantage Multi-Sports in Quebec City in Canada that was part of Tier III of the 1999 WTA Tour. It was the 7th edition of the Challenge Bell, and was held from November 1 through November 7, 1999. Jennifer Capriati won the singles title.

Champions

Singles

 Jennifer Capriati def.  Chanda Rubin, 4–6, 6–1, 6–2
It was Capriati's 2nd title of the year and the 8th of her career.

Doubles

 Amy Frazier /  Katie Schlukebir def.  Cara Black /  Debbie Graham, 6–2, 6–3
It was Frazier's only title of the year and the 4th of her career. It was Schlukebir's only title of the year and the 1st of her career.

External links
Official website

Challenge Bell
Tournoi de Québec
Challenge Bell
1990s in Quebec City